The Long March is a live album by American jazz drummer Max Roach and saxophonist Archie Shepp recorded in 1979 for the Swiss Hathut label.

Reception
The AllMusic review by Thom Jurek awarded the album 4½ stars stating "The Long March is one of the truly important duet records in post-bop era jazz history".

Track listing
All compositions by Max Roach except as indicated
 "J.C. Moses" - 5:52 
 "Sophisticated Lady" (Duke Ellington, Irving Mills, Mitchell Parish) - 5:46 
 "The Long March" - 26:17 
 "U-Jaa-Ma" (Archie Shepp) - 12:30 
 "Triptych" - 7:26 
 "Giant Steps" (John Coltrane) - 5:35 
 "South Africa Goddamn" - 20:09 
 "It's Time" - 9:36 
Recorded at the Jazz Festival Willisau '79 in Willisau, Switzerland on August 31, 1979

Personnel
Archie Shepp - tenor saxophone 
Max Roach - drums

References

Hathut Records live albums
Max Roach live albums
Archie Shepp live albums
1979 live albums